L. chinensis  may refer to:
 Leptocanna chinensis, a bamboo species endemic to Yunnan, China
 Litchi chinensis, the lychee, a tropical and subtropical fruit tree species primarily found in Asia, Southern Africa and Mexico
 Lobelia chinensis, a flowering plant species found in China

See also
 Chinensis (disambiguation)